Major General Albert E. Milloy (25 November 19213 June 2012) was a United States Army officer who served in World War II, the Korean War and the Vietnam War.

Early life
He was born on 25 November 1921 in Hattiesburg, Mississippi.

Military career
During World War II he served in the 504th Parachute Infantry Regiment.

During the Korean War he served as a Major in the 2nd Infantry Division.

He commanded the 2nd Brigade, 1st Infantry Division in South Vietnam in early 1966, leading it in Operation Mastiff and Operation Mallett.

He served as commander of the John F. Kennedy Special Warfare Center and School from 1966 to 1968.

In August 1969 he assumed command of the 1st Infantry Division in South Vietnam. He led the division until its departure from South Vietnam on 4 April 1970. He rejected the idea of a divisional farewell march from Lai Khe to Long Binh Post.

On 21 March 1970 he was appointed as commander of the  23rd Infantry Division, replacing Major General Lloyd B. Ramsey, who had been injured in a helicopter crash. He served as commander until November 1970, during this time he dealt with the aftermath of the Mỹ Lai massacre, which had been conducted by units of the division. He advised congressional investigators that Mỹ Lai was insecure and infested with mines and booby-traps. He was later described by his subordinate Norman Schwarzkopf as “the kind of muddy-boots commander I admired.”

Later life
He died on 3 June 2012 and was buried in Arlington National Cemetery.

Decorations
His decorations include Distinguished Service Medal, Silver Star (3), Legion of Merit (2), Distinguished Flying Cross and Bronze Star (3).

References

United States Army personnel of World War II
United States Army personnel of the Korean War
United States Army personnel of the Vietnam War
1921 births
2012 deaths